The Legislature XIX of Italian Republic is the current legislature of the Italian Parliament, which started on 13 October 2022.

The composition of the Chamber of Deputies and the Senate of the Republic is the one resulting from the 2022 Italian general election on 25 September, called after the dissolution of the Parliament announced by President Sergio Mattarella on 21 July. Per the 2020 Italian constitutional referendum, in the Chamber the number of members has been reduced from 630 to 400, while in the Senate the number of elective members has been reduced from 315 to 200.

Government

Current composition

Chamber of Deputies 

 President: Lorenzo Fontana (Lega), elected on 14 October 2022
 Vice Presidents: Anna Ascani (PD), Sergio Costa (M5S), Giorgio Mulè (FI), Fabio Rampelli (FdI)

Senate of the Republic 

 President: Ignazio La Russa (FdI), elected on 13 October 2022
 Vice Presidents: Maria Domenica Castellone (M5S), Gian Marco Centinaio (Lega), Maurizio Gasparri (FI), Anna Rossomando (PD)

See also
2022 President of the Italian Senate election
2022 President of the Italian Chamber of Deputies election
2022 Italian government formation

References 

2022 establishments in Italy
Legislature of Italy
Legislatures of Italy